Chemotherapy-induced hyperpigmentation is caused by many chemotherapeutic agents (especially the antibiotics bleomycin, and daunorubicin) and the alkylating agents (cyclophosphamide and busulfan).

See also
Skin lesion

References

External links 

 

Drug eruptions